Novak Djokovic defeated Juan Martín del Potro in the final, 6–3, 7–6(7–4), 6–3 to win the men's singles tennis title at the 2018 US Open.	It was his third US Open title and 14th major title overall.
	
Rafael Nadal was the defending champion, but he retired in the semifinals against del Potro. Nadal and Roger Federer were in contention for the ATP no. 1 singles ranking; Nadal retained the top ranking after Federer lost in the fourth round.

This tournament was the last major for former world No. 3 David Ferrer; he retired from his first round match against Nadal due to injury. This was also the first major since Wimbledon 2017 in which former world No. 1 Andy Murray participated, entering with a protected ranking. He lost in the second round to Fernando Verdasco.

This marked the first time in the tournament's history that seven former men's singles champions competed: Federer, del Potro, Nadal, Djokovic, Murray, Marin Čilić and Stan Wawrinka.

Peter Polansky became the first player in history to qualify for the main draw of all four majors as a lucky loser in a calendar year.

Seeds
All seedings per ATP rankings.

Qualifying

Draw

Finals

Top half

Section 1

Section 2

Section 3

Section 4

Bottom half

Section 5

Section 6

Section 7

Section 8

References

Main draw

External links
2018 US Open – Men's draws and results at the International Tennis Federation

Men's singles
US Open – Men's Singles
US Open (tennis) by year – Men's singles